Harun Aur Rashid Khan is a politician from Chittagong District of Bangladesh. He was elected a member of parliament from  Chittagong-9 in a 1988 by-election.

Career 
Harun Aur Rashid Khan was elected a member of parliament for constituency Chittagong-9 as a Jatiya Party candidate.

References 

Living people
Year of birth missing (living people)
People from Chittagong District
Jatiya Party (Ershad) politicians
4th Jatiya Sangsad members